Kevin Jones (born February 25, 1964) is a former professional rugby league footballer who played in the 1980s and 1990s.

References

External links
Stanley Rangers ARLFC - Roll of Honour

1964 births
Living people
Castleford Tigers players
Doncaster R.L.F.C. players
English rugby league players
Place of birth missing (living people)
Rugby league five-eighths
Rugby league halfbacks